Augustów  is a settlement in Gmina Wądroże Wielkie, Jawor County, Lower Silesian Voivodeship, in south-western Poland.

From 1975 to 1998 the village was in Legnica Voivodeship.

References

Villages in Jawor County